This Acoustic Glitch is an EP by British indie rock band The Wombats, released in 2011. The EP was set as a free download on their web page. It includes acoustic versions of two songs from their second album This Modern Glitch.

Track listing
All songs composed by The Wombats.
"Techno Fan" (acoustic) – 3:55
"Anti-D" (acoustic) – 4:44

References

The Wombats albums
2011 EPs